Barabhum railway station is a railway station on Purulia–Tatanagar line of Adra railway division of Indian Railways' South Eastern Railway zone. It is situated beside Baghmundi Road, Balarampur at Rangadih in Purulia district in the Indian state of West Bengal. This railway station serves Balarampur CD Block and Baghmundi area. Total 30 trains including number of Express and passenger trains stop at Barabhum railway station.

History
The Bengal Nagpur Railway was formed in 1887 for the purpose of upgrading the Nagpur Chhattisgarh Railway. Purulia–Chakradharpur rail line was opened on 22 January 1890. The Purulia–Chakradharpur rout including Barabhum railway station was electrified in 1961–62.

References

Adra railway division
Railway stations in Purulia district
1890 establishments in India